The great Oulu fire may refer to the following fires that have ravaged the city of Oulu, Finland]:

 Great Oulu fire of 1652

 Great Oulu fire of 1882
 Great Oulu fire of 1916

See also
 Great Fire (disambiguation)